Welcome To Tokyo is the debut album by Germany based J-Pop girl group Shanadoo. The album was released in 2006 to Germany and 2007 to Japan. The album featured the singles King Kong, My Samurai (a Japanese version of "Fred Come to Bed" by E-Rotic) and Guilty of Love (a Japanese version of "The Power of Sex" by E-Rotic).

Information

The album was released in Germany in December 2006, although the band speaks Japanese natively the album was not released in Japan until two months after in February 2007. The album was a commercial success and put Shanadoo's name out across Germany. It peaked at #63 on the DE Alben charts

Singles 

"King Kong" was released as the lead single on June 16, 2006 in Germany, it was not released in Japan. The song is a cover of Hinoi Team's cover version of the song, which was originally recorded by E-Rotic. The  for the single showcased the group dancing in a pink room and also incorporates a ParaPara dance
"My Samurai" was released to Germany on September 15, 2006. The lyrics were written by John O'Flynn & Miyabi Sudo and uses the music to Fred Come to Bed by German Eurodance group E-Rotic. The  displays the girls dancing in a white room and a room with lights, while also flashing back and forth to a modern-day Samurai swinging his sword.
"Guilty of Love" was released as the 3rd and final single from the album. Released in Germany on November 17, 2006, the song is a Japanese language cover of E-Rotic's The Power of Sex. The song's lyrics were written by Ayaka Ichihashi and produced by David Brandes. The  shows the girls in a traditional Indian setting writing kanji in the sand with sticks. They are dressed in Indian garments and are singing inside temples and palaces. They are also shown in front of Japanese shrines wearing kimono.

Track listing 

There are three different versions of the album. The original German release, plus a Japanese edition and a Limited edition. The first thirteen tracks are the same for all versions of the album and are as follows.

Personnel
Credits for Welcome To Tokyo adapted from album insert.

 Vocals: Junko Fukuda, Chika Shibuya, Manami Fuku, Marina Genda
 Producer: David Brandes & Felix J. Gauder
 Keyboards & Programming: Felix J. Gauder, Domenico Labarile, Domenico Livarno, Pit Loew & Gary Jones.
 Guitars: Markus Wienstroer & Manuel Lopez
 Mixer: Gary Jones & Bernie Staub
 Vocal Recording: Gary Jones, Tomoharu Shawada & Miyabi Sudo
 Photography: Michael Wilfling, Sascha Kramer, Manfred Esser
 Artwork: Jan Weskott

Release history

References

External links 
 Purchase album (Japanese Edition)
 Official site 
 Official site 
 Official forum
 Official fanshop

2006 albums